Six referendums were held in Switzerland during 2010; three in March on pension funds, animal protection and a constitutional amendment, one in September on unemployment benefits, and two in November on deporting foreign criminals and introducing a canton tax.

Results

March
Voters approved Provision 1, an amendment to the constitution on research on humans.

Voters rejected Provision 2, a federal decree on providing enhanced legal protection for animals.

Voters also rejected Provision 3, a federal law which would change the minimum conversion rate for occupational and disability pension plans.

September
The referendum held on 26 September had a single topic, namely the revision of unemployment benefits. The centre and right-wing parties were in favour of the revision, which was undertaken to reduce the debt of the ALV, while the left-wing parties were against it.

The referendum was approved by 53.4% of voters, although only the German-speaking cantons (all of them except Basel-Stadt, which was against it with 50.4%) approved it.

November
The referendum held on 28 November had two issues:

 «Für die Ausschaffung krimineller Ausländer» ("For the deportation of criminal foreigners"), proposed by the Swiss People's Party, as well as a counterproposal by the other partes; and
 «Steuergerechtigkeits-Initiative» ("Taxation justice initiative") for higher taxes on high incomes and property as well as the introduction of a minimum cantonal tax.

The SVP's federal popular initiative on deportation was accepted with 52.2% and a majority of cantons in favour, while the counterproposal failed with only 44.5% in favour. Whilst it was not required, the tie-breaker showed a majority of voters against but a majority of cantons for. On 28 February 2016, a follow-up initiative, also launched by the SVP, was rejected by voters. The deportation initiative went in effect on 1 October 2016.

The taxation initiative failed with only 41.5% in favour.

Withdrawn
In August 2010, family members of a murder victim launched another constitutional amendment initiative to provide for Capital punishment in cases of murder combined with sexual violence. The initiative quickly found itself at the center of public attention and was roundly rejected by political leaders; it was withdrawn a day after its official publication.

References

2010 elections in Switzerland
2010 referendums
2010
Constitutional amendments
Pension referendums
Constitutional referendums in Switzerland